Per Scholas is a United States nonprofit that provides tuition-free technology training to unemployed or underemployed adults for careers as IT professionals.

Per Scholas was founded in 1995 by John Stookey and Lewis Miller in the South Bronx, New York City. Today Per Scholas is in 14 cities across the country: Atlanta, GA; Baltimore, MD; Boston, MA; Charlotte, NC; Chicago, IL; Cincinnati and Columbus, OH; Denver, CO; Detroit, MI; Dallas, TX; the National Capital Region; Newark, NJ; New York, NY; and Philadelphia, PA. To date, Per Scholas has trained 8,000 individuals.

Programs

IT training programs
Per Scholas offers free IT training and workforce development programs.

Per Scholas offers a range of free technology and professional development training, based on local market demands. Each Per Scholas program includes hands-on technical skills training, job skills instruction, individualized support for job placement, and personal and career advancement.

The success of the Per Scholas training programs (relative to earlier workforce development programs) is attributed in large part to its understanding of the industries its students will enter. The organization works in close partnership with many prominent corporations. Per Scholas’ instructors are experienced experts and its leadership consists of leading professionals in the IT field. Training is also structured to fill specific demands in the labor force.

The programs are funded by an array of partners, including corporations,  foundations, public agencies, elected officials, and other people.

Additional IT Courses
In addition to the standard IT Support career-track training, offerings have been expanding to include courses for careers in network engineering, software testing / quality assurance, cyber security, web development and more to respond to labor demands within the sector.

Social Ventures
In August 2013, Per Scholas launched the Software Testing Education Program (STEP)--an 8-week training that prepares graduates to fill entry-level software testing roles. While developing this program, Per Scholas was given the opportunity to partner with software consulting company Doran Jones to create the Urban Development Center, a software testing center built adjacent to Per Scholas' Bronx location to employ graduates in the software testing field.

Platform by Per Scholas 
Platform by Per Scholas (PxPS) offers employer customized training tracks that put students in direct hiring pipelines with major technology employers, as an extension of the Per Scholas workforce development model. Platform students receive tuition-free, hands-on training, career development resources and interview opportunities with technology employers to help take their career to the next level.  PxPS currently operates career tracks with corporate partners in New York (Bronx, Manhattan), Pennsylvania, and Texas (Dallas, Irving) for aspiring Java/Python/.Net Developers, Data Engineers, SOC Analysts, Programmer Analysts, Quality Engineers, and RPA Developers.

Recognition 
Per Scholas was featured in WIRED magazine in November 2014.

Four Per Scholas graduates were featured in the New York Times in the winter of 2014.

In 2012, Per Scholas was named one of America's top-performing nonprofit organizations by the Social Impact Exchange S&100 Index for its impressive outcomes and results-driven work.

Per Scholas received a Heroes Award from the Robin Hood Foundation in 2011.

Leadership
Founder and Chairman Emeritus John Hoyt Stookey was chairman, president and CEO of Quantum through 1993, and has held positions on various boards since retiring in 1995. 

Current Chairman Lewis E. Miller is the president of Qvidian, a provider of cloud-computing applications, and was previously CEO of Synergistics and The Future Now, Inc.

CEO and President Plinio Ayala was previously director of program operations at SOBRO. In 2006 he received the Liberty Award from the New York Post for his work in the NYC community and in 2005 was issued a Citation of Merit by the Bronx Borough President.

Each regional site outside of New York has an advisory board as well.

References

501(c)(3) organizations
Port Morris, Bronx
Education in the Bronx
Non-profit organizations based in the Bronx